Lucapinella limatula is a species of sea snail, a marine gastropod mollusk in the family Fissurellidae, the keyhole limpets.

Description
Length 1/2 to 3/4 inches.  Shell oval, only moderately elevated; orifice near center and large, often somewhat triangular.  Sculpture of alternating larger and smaller radiating ribs, made scaly by concentric wrinkles.  Color brownish, with spotted whitish rays; interior white.

Distribution
This species occurs in moderately deep water in the Atlantic Ocean off the Cape Verdes, West Africa, Angola; in the Caribbean Sea, the Gulf of Mexico and the Lesser Antilles.

References

Morris, P.A. (1973) "A Field Guide to Shells of the Atlantic and Gulf Coasts and the West Indies," Houghton Mifflin Company, Boston.
 Turgeon, D.D., et al. 1998. Common and scientific names of aquatic invertebrates of the United States and Canada. American Fisheries Society Special Publication 26 page(s): 58
 Rolán E., 2005. Malacological Fauna From The Cape Verde Archipelago. Part 1, Polyplacophora and Gastropoda.
 Rosenberg, G., F. Moretzsohn, and E. F. García. 2009. Gastropoda (Mollusca) of the Gulf of Mexico, pp. 579–699 in Felder, D.L. and D.K. Camp (eds.), Gulf of Mexico–Origins, Waters, and Biota. Biodiversity. Texas A&M Press, College Station, Texas.

Fissurellidae
Gastropods described in 1850
Molluscs of the Atlantic Ocean
Molluscs of Angola
Gastropods of Cape Verde